Wilkins Runway is a single runway aerodrome operated by Australia, located on upper glacier of the ice sheet Preston Heath, Budd Coast, Wilkes Land, on the continent of Antarctica, but  southeast of the actual coast. It is named after Sir Hubert Wilkins, a pioneer of Antarctic aviation and exploration.

History
Construction of a runway in the Australian Antarctic Territory was first suggested in the 1950s, but logistical, political and environmental issues delayed construction of the runway until 2004.

In order to be approved by Australia's Civil Aviation Safety Authority (CASA), Wilkins must be levelled to runway standard with the use of lasers and requires a crew of eight to maintain the level and friction of the runway before each landing.

Activities
CASA issued an aviation licence for the airline Skytraders to operate passenger flights, and the first flight was made on 11 January 2008, carrying Australia's Environment Minister Peter Garrett, twelve scientists and six other passengers.

Flights to Antarctica leave from Hobart International Airport in Tasmania using an Airbus A319, and the flight takes around four hours. Prior to the runway's completion, the trip to Antarctica involved a ten-day journey by ship across the Southern Ocean from Hobart. The runway operates only during the Antarctic summer, and twenty to thirty flights per season are planned. The flights are used to transport scientists conducting Antarctic research, and are not available for tourist flights. However, since the opening of the runway, no more than 10 flights in one season have been achieved. This is primarily due to environmental conditions at the site, temperatures being warmer and causing melt of the runway, thus decreasing the window of opportunity to use the runway. As of January 2012, only four flights were planned for the summer season and all in February 2012.

In 2015, the Royal Australian Air Force and the Australian Antarctic Division commenced cargo flights from Hobart International Airport to Wilkins Runway using C-17 Globemaster aircraft. The service will also be used for medical evacuations, if required. The C-17 was used as a faster and more frequent alternative to the Aurora Australis supply vessel.

In March 2022, Wilkins reported 15 successful flights.

Airlines and destinations

See also
 List of airports in territories of Australia
 List of airports in Antarctica
 Aviation transport in Australia

References

External links
Wilkins Runway, Australian Antarctic Division

Airports in Antarctica
Australian Antarctic Territory
Airports established in 2008
Airports in territories of Australia
2008 establishments in Antarctica